For its campaign against Norway and Denmark during World War II, the German Luftwaffe had the following order of battle on 9 April 1940.

X. Fliegerkorps
Commanded by Generalleutnant Hans Geisler

See also
 Luftwaffe Organization
 German Air Fleets in World War II

References

Bibliography
 Hooton, E.R (2007). Luftwaffe at War; Blitzkrieg in the West: Volume 2. London: Chevron/Ian Allan. .

Luftwaffe
World War II orders of battle